Frank Shore (born 1887) was a South African cyclist. He competed in four events at the 1908 Summer Olympics.

References

External links
 

1887 births
Year of death missing
South African male cyclists
Olympic cyclists of South Africa
Cyclists at the 1908 Summer Olympics
Place of birth missing